The San Ysidro School District (SYSD) is a public school district in San Diego County, California, United States. It includes five elementary schools, one middle school, and several preschools in the San Ysidro community in San Diego, California as well as two elementary schools elsewhere in San Diego.

History

In the 2012–2013 school year, there was conflict between the San Ysidro Teachers association and the school board. Teachers accused the school board of favoritism toward the assistant superintendent, Jason Romero, because his mother sat on the school board. The connection became controversial when she voted to give her son a $10,000 raise. Teachers also opposed a proposal to give the school board the final say over teacher grievances, which amounted to a review of actions by Romero. As of February 2013, no contract had been agreed to, and teachers were picketing outside some schools.

An investigation is currently under way over a $2,500 cash payment, given in 2010 to school superintendent Manuel Paul from a contractor with business pending before the district. Paul says the money was intended for the election campaigns of school board members. Paul and fourteen other people were indicted January 15, 2013 on corruption charges. On April 4, 2013, the school board voted 3–2 to accept Paul's resignation.

Schools
 Middle school
 San Ysidro Middle School
 Vista Del Mar Middle School

 Elementary schools
 La Mirada School
 Ocean View School
 Smythe School
 Sunset School
 Willow School

 Preschool
 Preschool/CDC

References

External links

 

School districts in San Diego County, California
Education in San Diego
School districts established in 1887
1887 establishments in California